Ocean View Elementary School District is a school district in Ventura County, California, USA. It is located towards the south of Oxnard and encompasses  of land on the coast west of Malibu. The District currently enrolls about 2,500 students in its schools and contains a diverse ethnic population.

The district contains one middle school, three elementary schools, and two pre-schools. The district itself contains no high schools, so all students leaving the middle school must leave the district to go to high school, usually to Channel Islands High School.

History
Ocean View Elementary School District was founded in 1872 at the completion of a one-room schoolhouse at the corner of what is now Olds and Hueneme Roads. As it still does, the district sent its students to another district for high school completion. In the 1950s, the District added elementary schools and a junior high to accommodate the post-World War II population growth from both Oxnard and nearby Point Mugu Naval Air Station.

List of schools
Middle schools
Ocean View Junior High

Elementary schools
Mar Vista Elementary
Laguna Vista Elementary
Tierra Vista Elementary

Pre-schools
Ocean View Early Education School
Ocean Vista Early Education School

References

External links

School districts in Ventura County, California
1872 establishments in California
School districts established in 1872